Dehnow-e Alibaba (also Romanized as Dehnow-e ʿAlībābā) is a village in Rig Rural District, in the Central District of Lordegan County, Chaharmahal and Bakhtiari Province, Iran. At the 2006 census, its population was 147, in 29 families.

References 

Populated places in Lordegan County